The Beaver River is a tributary of the Liard River, entering that stream in the area of its Grand Canyon just south of the British Columbia-Yukon border (the 60th parallel north)  after running generally south-east from its origin in the extreme southeast corner of the Yukon Territory.

Tributaries
Tributaries of the Beaver River include, from origin to mouth, the following:
Pool Creek
Gold Pay Creek
Whitefish River
Larsen Creek
Saucy Creek
Crow River

See also
List of rivers of Yukon

References

Canadian GeoNames Database entry "Beaver River, Yukon"
Canadian GeoNames Database entry "Beaver River, British Columbia"

External links
Canadian GeoNames Database location map

Rivers of British Columbia
Rivers of Yukon
Liard Country
Tributaries of the Liard River